Kish Airlines (Havāpeymāyi-e Kish) is an airline operating from Kish Island, Iran. It operates international, domestic and charter services as a scheduled carrier. Its main bases are Kish International Airport and Mehrabad International Airport, Tehran.

History

The airline was established on December 16, 1989, and started operations in 1990. It is owned by Kish Free Zone Organisation (79%), Kish Investment and Development (11%) and Kish Development and Servicing (10%).

To start its passenger operations, after receiving temporary operations permission, the airline leased two aircraft (three Tupolev Tu-154 and four McDonnell Douglas MD-82/MD-83) from Bulgaria Airlines on a wet lease basis. Kish Air received its air operator certificate (AOC) in 1991 after demonstrating its competence to the Civil Aviation authorities, during its first year of operations, thus becoming the first private company to receive its AOC from Civil Aviation of Iran. At this time the company began wet-leasing three Tupolev Tu-154Ms from Russian leasing companies, returning the previously leased Bulgarian aircraft. The company also wet-leased two Yakovlev Yak-42D aircraft from Russia.

Towards the end of 1992, the company was at the verge of bankruptcy, and most of the key managers were replaced by a new team, most of whom are still running the company successfully today. In 1999, Kish Air having enough financial strength, decided to replace its wet-leased fleet with dry leased and purchased aircraft, and within a year was able to operate two dry leased and two purchased Tupolev Tu-154 aircraft and hire and train the required aircrew and maintenance personnel. At present Kish Air is also operating a fleet of medium-range MD-80 series aircraft and short-range Fokker 100 on its domestic and international routes.

Destinations

As of September 2022, Kish Air operates services to the following destinations:

Fleet

As of August 2019, Kish Air operates the following aircraft:

Fleet development
In April 2017, it was announced that the airline planned to order six aircraft from ATR, with variant and delivery dates announced if, and when, the deal is signed by the airline. The aircraft were planned to be used to increase the number of flights on domestic flights in Iran.

Former fleet
The airline previously operated the following aircraft (at November 2017):
 2 Airbus A320 leased from Jordan Aviation
 1 Boeing 737-500 leased from Bukovyna Airlines
 7 Fokker 50

Accidents and incidents
On 19 September 1995, Kish Air Flight 707 was hijacked by flight attendant Reza Jabbari and landed in Israel, where the hijacker was arrested. Jabbari requested asylum and declared his intention of converting to Judaism.Sentenced to eight years in prison, he served four years but was granted asylum and remained in Israel. He eventually became an Israeli citizen and converted to Judaism.
On 10 February 2004, Kish Air Flight 7170, operated by a Fokker 50 Mk.050, crashed at Sharjah International Airport killing 43 people. Three survived with serious injuries. The cause was that the propellers were put into reverse pitch while the aircraft was in flight.

See also
 List of airlines of Iran

References

External links

Kish Air fleet list
Kish Air photos

 
Airlines established in 1989
Airlines of Iran
Iranian brands
Iranian companies established in 1989